Eunidia savioi is a species of beetle in the family Cerambycidae. It was described by Pic in 1925.

References

Eunidiini
Beetles described in 1925